Linden Grove is an unincorporated community in Linden Grove Township, Saint Louis County, Minnesota, United States.

The community is located 14 miles south of Orr, and eight miles west of Cook, at the junction of State Highway 1 (MN 1) and State Highway 73 (MN 73).

The Little Fork River flows through the community.

Notes
Linden Grove is also a street in southeast London (SE26 5PH).  Linden Grove is also a street in Milton Keynes (MK 14).

References

 Rand McNally Road Atlas – 2007 edition – Minnesota entry
 Official State of Minnesota Highway Map – 2011/2012 edition

Unincorporated communities in Minnesota
Unincorporated communities in St. Louis County, Minnesota